Roanoke Downtown Historic District may refer to:

Roanoke Downtown Historic District (Alabama), listed on the NRHP in Alabama
Roanoke Downtown Historic District (Roanoke, Virginia), listed on the NRHP in Virginia